Daniel H. Wilson (born March 6, 1978) is a New York Times bestselling author, television host and robotics engineer. He currently resides in Portland, Oregon. His books include the award-winning humor titles How to Survive a Robot Uprising, Where's My Jetpack? and How to Build a Robot Army and the bestseller Robopocalypse.

Early life
Daniel H. Wilson was born in Tulsa, Oklahoma, the elder of two children. He is Cherokee and a citizen of the Cherokee Nation.

Education
Wilson attended Booker T. Washington High School, graduating in 1996. He earned his B.S. in Computer Science at the University of Tulsa in 2000, spending one semester studying philosophy abroad in Melbourne, Australia at the University of Melbourne. He completed an M.S. in Robotics, another M.S. in Machine Learning, and his PhD in Robotics in 2005 at the Robotics Institute at Carnegie Mellon University in Pittsburgh, Pennsylvania. His thesis work, entitled Assistive Intelligent Environments for Automatic Health Monitoring, focused on providing automatic location and activity monitoring in the home via low-cost sensors such as motion detectors and contact switches. He has worked as a research intern at Microsoft Research, the Xerox PARC, Northrop Grumman, and Intel Research Seattle.

Awards

How to Survive a Robot Uprising won a Rave Award from Wired and was chosen by the American Library Association (ALA) as a "2007 Popular Paperback for Young Adults".
Where's My Jetpack? was a GQ Media Pick for 2007.
How to Build a Robot Army was chosen by the American Library Association (ALA) as a "2009 Quick Pick for Reluctant Young Adult Readers."
Robopocalypse was a New York Times bestseller; a Los Angeles Times bestseller; a winner of the Alex Awards presented by the Young Adult Library Services Association (YALSA); a Barnes & Noble Best Book of 2011; a nominee for the John W. Campbell Memorial Award for Best Science Fiction Novel; and a nominee for the 2012 Endeavor Award.
Robogenesis was a Los Angeles Times bestseller.
Wilson was the Guest of Honor at the Capricon 33 science fiction convention, held in Chicago.

Bibliography

Novels
 A Boy and His Bot, middle reader (New York: Bloomsbury Children's, 2011)
 Amped, techno thriller (New York: Doubleday, 2012)
 The Clockwork Dynasty, techno thriller (New York: Doubleday, 2017)

Robopocalypse
  Robopocalypse, techno thriller (New York: Doubleday, 2011)
 Robogenesis, techno thriller (New York: Doubleday, 2014)

Michael Crichton's Andromeda
 The Andromeda Evolution, techno thriller (New York: Harper, 2019)
This is a sequel to Michael Crichton's novel The Andromeda Strain.

Short fiction 
Collections
 Guardian Angels and Other Monsters, short story collection (New York: Doubleday, March 6, 2018)
Anthologies edited
 Robot Uprisings, co-edited with John Joseph Adams (New York: Vintage, 2014)
 
Stories

 "Parasite" (in 21st Century Dead: A Zombie Anthology, edited by Christopher Golden, St. Martin's Press, 2012)
 "Helmet" (in Armored, edited by John Joseph Adams, Baen Books, 2012)
 "Freshee's Frogurt" (in Diverse Energies, edited by Tobias S. Buckell and Joe Monti, Tu Books, 2012)
 "Foul Weather" (in "Nightmare Magazine", edited by John Joseph Adams, 2012)
 "The Executor" (in The Mad Scientist's Guide to World Domination, edited by John Joseph Adams, Tor, 2013)
 "The Blue Afternoon that Lasted Forever" (in Carbide Tipped Pens, edited by Ben Bova, Tor, 2014)

Comic books
 "Earth 2: World's End" (26 issue weekly series, with Marguerite Bennett and Mike Johnson, DC Comics, 2014)
 "Earth 2: Futures End" (one-shot, art by Eddy Barrows, DC Comics, 2014)
 "Earth 2: Society" (7 issue monthly series, art by Jorge Jimenez, DC Comics, 2015)
 "Spooky Shit" (in "Zombies Vs. Robots: Seasons of War", illustrated by Sam Kieth and edited by Chris Ryall, IDW, 2012)

Graphic novels
 "Quarantine Zone", illustrated by Fernando Pasarin (DC Comics, 2016)

Non-fiction
 How To Survive a Robot Uprising: Tips on Defending Yourself Against the Coming Rebellion, humor (New York: Bloomsbury, 2005)
 Where's My Jetpack?: A Guide to the Amazing Science Fiction Future That Never Arrived, humor (New York: Bloomsbury, 2007)
 How to Build a Robot Army: Tips on Defending Planet Earth Against Aliens, Ninjas, and Zombies, humor (New York: Bloomsbury, 2008)
 The Mad Scientist Hall of Fame: Muwahahaha!, humor (New York: Citadel, 2008)
 Bro-Jitsu: The Martial Art of Sibling Smackdown, humor (New York: Bloomsbury Children's, 2010)

Apps
 "Mayday! Deep Space", developed with Mountain Machine Studios and voiced by Osric Chau, Bitsie Tulloch, and Claire Coffee (January 7, 2015)

Critical studies and reviews of Wilson's work
Press Start to play

Film adaptations

How to Survive a Robot Uprising
How to Survive A Robot Uprising, published during Wilson's final year of graduate school in late 2005, was optioned by Paramount Pictures. A screenplay was written by Tom Lennon and Ben Garant, and produced by Mike DeLuca. Mike Myers was attached to star;. The sequel to How to Survive a Robot Uprising, called "How to Build a Robot Army", was also optioned by Paramount Pictures. However, the options eventually expired.

In October 2010, How to Survive A Robot Uprising was re-optioned by Steve Pink (writer of the films High Fidelity and Grosse Pointe Blank) and actor Jack Black.

Bro-Jitsu
In May 2007 (before publication), Bro-Jitsu was optioned by Nickelodeon Movies (a subset of Paramount Pictures) and Wilson hired to write the screenplay.

Robopocalypse
In November 2009, Wilson sold his novel Robopocalypse to Doubleday, with Jason Kaufman (editor of Dan Brown, among others) coming on as editor. One day before rights to the novel were purchased, Wilson sold film rights to DreamWorks SKG, with Steven Spielberg officially signing on to direct. On March 7, 2018, Michael Bay replaced Spielberg as director over Spielberg's scheduling conflicts.

Amped
In November 2010, Wilson sold his novel AMPED to Doubleday, again working with editor Jason Kaufman. Film rights to the novel were sold to Summit Entertainment, with Alex Proyas (Dark City, The Crow, I, Robot) attached to direct.

The Nostalgist
In 2014, Wilson's short story was adapted into the short film The Nostalgist written and directed by Giacomo Cimini. The short film premièred June 19, 2014, at the Palm Springs International Shortfest.

Alpha
In 2014, it was announced that Lionsgate Studios has acquired the distributing rights to Wilson's screenplay for the upcoming sci-fi film Alpha. Anthony Scott Burns is attached to direct, and Brad Pitt is reportedly involved in production as well.

Television host
Wilson hosted a series on the History Channel entitled The Works, which debuted on July 10, 2008. Ten episodes of The Works aired, in which Wilson explained the hidden workings of everyday items, including Sneakers, Guns, Beer, Garbage, Robots, Skydiving, Power Tools, Steel, Motorcycles, and Tattoos. He has also appeared as himself in Modern Marvels and Countdown to Doomsday.

References

External links

 'Where's My Jetpack?' Looks for the Missing Future interview on NPR Weekend Edition with Scot Simon May 5, 2007
 
 Back to the Future book review in Salon.com May 12, 2007
 Daniel H. Wilson Official Website
 History Channel's The Works Official Website
 How to Survive a Robot Uprising Official Website
 If Robots Ever Get Too Smart, He'll Know How to Stop Them book review in The New York Times February 14, 2006
 Mayday! Deep Space Official Website
 Myers leads Par 'Uprising' Variety April 26, 2006
 Nickelodeon strikes 'Bro-Jitsu" deal Variety May 16, 2007
 Par leads 'Uprising' Variety April 26, 2006
 Required Reading book review in New York Post January 13, 2008
 Robots, Today and Tomorrow interview on Coast to Coast AM February 10, 2008
 Survive a Robot Attack interview on This Week in Science July 25, 2006
 The Nostalgist Official Website
 The story behind Robogenesis - Essay by Daniel H. Wilson at Upcoming4.me
 The story behind Small Things - Essay by Daniel H. Wilson at Upcoming4.me
 What Happened to our Moonbases and Jetpacks? interview on NPR Weekend Edition with Liane Hansen July 19, 2009

1978 births
Living people
Booker T. Washington High School (Tulsa, Oklahoma) alumni
Cherokee writers
Writers from Oregon
Writers from Tulsa, Oklahoma
University of Tulsa alumni
Carnegie Mellon University alumni
American television personalities
American male novelists